This is a list of the Voivodeship Marshals of Silesia  since the creation of the position in 1999. The Voivodeship Marshal of Silesia is the head of the provincial government and is the chief of the executive board. The marshal is appointed by the Silesian Regional Assembly and relies on its confidence for the duration of his or her term of office.

See also
Voivodeship marshal
Silesian Voivodeship
Silesian Regional Assembly

External links
Marshal of Silesia official website

Marshals
Marshals of Silesian Voivodeship
Silesian